Jürg is the name of:

 Jürg Amann (1947–2013), Swiss author and dramatist
 Jürg Baur (1918–2010), German composer and teacher of classical music
 Jürg Berger (born 1954), retired Swiss professional ice hockey forward
 Jürg Capol (born 1965), Swiss cross country skier
 Jürg Federspiel (1931–2007), Swiss writer
 Hans-Jürg Fehr (born 1948), president (2004-) of the Social Democratic Party of Switzerland
 Jürg Fröhlich (born 1946), Swiss mathematician and theoretical physicist
 Jürg Kreienbühl (1932–2007), Swiss and French painter
 Jürg M. Stauffer (born 1977), Swiss politician
 Jürg Studer (born 1966), Swiss football defender
 Jürg Wenger (born 1969), Swiss skeleton racer

See also